Dnevnik MRT is the main news program of the MRT, broadcast daily at 19:30.

Presenters

 This list is not complete

See also
 MRT
 Dnevnik HRT

References

Macedonian television series
Macedonian Radio Television original programming